In biology, a phylum (plural: phyla) is a level of classification or taxonomic rank below kingdom and above class. Traditionally, in botany the term division has been used instead of phylum, although the International Code of Nomenclature for algae, fungi, and plants accepts the terms as equivalent. Depending on definitions, the animal kingdom Animalia contains about 31 phyla, the plant kingdom Plantae contains about 14 phyla, and the fungus kingdom Fungi contains about 8 phyla. Current research in phylogenetics is uncovering the relationships between phyla, which are contained in larger clades, like Ecdysozoa and Embryophyta.

General description 
Haeckel noted that species constantly evolved into new species that seemed to retain few consistent features among themselves and therefore few features that distinguished them as a group ("a self-contained unity"). "Wohl aber ist eine solche reale und vollkommen abgeschlossene Einheit die Summe aller Species, welche aus einer und derselben gemeinschaftlichen Stammform allmählig sich entwickelt haben, wie z. B. alle Wirbelthiere. Diese Summe nennen wir Stamm (Phylon)."  which translates as: However, perhaps such a real and completely self-contained unity is the aggregate of all species which have gradually evolved from one and the same common original form, as, for example, all vertebrates. We name this aggregate [a] Stamm [i.e., race] (Phylon). In plant taxonomy, August W. Eichler (1883) classified plants into five groups named divisions, a term that remains in use today for groups of plants, algae and fungi.
The definitions of zoological phyla have changed from their origins in the six Linnaean classes and the four  of Georges Cuvier.

Informally, phyla can be thought of as groupings of organisms based on general specialization of body plan. At its most basic, a phylum can be defined in two ways: as a group of organisms with a certain degree of morphological or developmental similarity (the phenetic definition), or a group of organisms with a certain degree of evolutionary relatedness (the phylogenetic definition). Attempting to define a level of the Linnean hierarchy without referring to (evolutionary) relatedness is unsatisfactory, but a phenetic definition is useful when addressing questions of a morphological nature—such as how successful different body plans were.

Definition based on genetic relation 

The most important objective measure in the above definitions is the "certain degree" that defines how different organisms need to be members of different phyla. The minimal requirement is that all organisms in a phylum should be clearly more closely related to one another than to any other group. Even this is problematic because the requirement depends on knowledge of organisms' relationships: as more data become available, particularly from molecular studies, we are better able to determine the relationships between groups. So phyla can be merged or split if it becomes apparent that they are related to one another or not. For example, the bearded worms were described as a new phylum (the Pogonophora) in the middle of the 20th century, but molecular work almost half a century later found them to be a group of annelids, so the phyla were merged (the bearded worms are now an annelid family). On the other hand, the highly parasitic phylum Mesozoa was divided into two phyla (Orthonectida and Rhombozoa) when it was discovered the Orthonectida are probably deuterostomes and the Rhombozoa protostomes.

This changeability of phyla has led some biologists to call for the concept of a phylum to be abandoned in favour of placing taxa in clades without any formal ranking of group size.

Definition based on body plan 
A definition of a phylum based on body plan has been proposed by paleontologists Graham Budd and Sören Jensen (as Haeckel had done a century earlier). The definition was posited because extinct organisms are hardest to classify: they can be offshoots that diverged from a phylum's line before the characters that define the modern phylum were all acquired. By Budd and Jensen's definition, a phylum is defined by a set of characters shared by all its living representatives.

This approach brings some small problems—for instance, ancestral characters common to most members of a phylum may have been lost by some members. Also, this definition is based on an arbitrary point of time: the present. However, as it is character based, it is easy to apply to the fossil record. A greater problem is that it relies on a subjective decision about which groups of organisms should be considered as phyla.

The approach is useful because it makes it easy to classify extinct organisms as "stem groups" to the phyla with which they bear the most resemblance, based only on the taxonomically important similarities. However, proving that a fossil belongs to the crown group of a phylum is difficult, as it must display a character unique to a sub-set of the crown group. Furthermore, organisms in the stem group of a phylum can possess the "body plan" of the phylum without all the characteristics necessary to fall within it. This weakens the idea that each of the phyla represents a distinct body plan.

A classification using this definition may be strongly affected by the chance survival of rare groups, which can make a phylum much more diverse than it would be otherwise.

Known phyla

Animals 

Total numbers are estimates; figures from different authors vary wildly, not least because some are based on described species, some on extrapolations to numbers of undescribed species. For instance, around 25,000–27,000 species of nematodes have been described, while published estimates of the total number of nematode species include 10,000–20,000; 500,000; 10 million; and 100 million.

Plants 

The kingdom Plantae is defined in various ways by different biologists (see Current definitions of Plantae). All definitions include the living embryophytes (land plants), to which may be added the two green algae divisions, Chlorophyta and Charophyta, to form the clade Viridiplantae. The table below follows the influential (though contentious) Cavalier-Smith system in equating "Plantae" with Archaeplastida, a group containing Viridiplantae and the algal Rhodophyta and Glaucophyta divisions.

The definition and classification of plants at the division level also varies from source to source, and has changed progressively in recent years. Thus some sources place horsetails in division Arthrophyta and ferns in division Monilophyta, while others place them both in Monilophyta, as shown below. The division Pinophyta may be used for all gymnosperms (i.e. including cycads, ginkgos and gnetophytes), or for conifers alone as below.

Since the first publication of the APG system in 1998, which proposed a classification of angiosperms up to the level of orders, many sources have preferred to treat ranks higher than orders as informal clades. Where formal ranks have been provided, the traditional divisions listed below have been reduced to a very much lower level, e.g. subclasses.

Fungi 

Phylum Microsporidia is generally included in kingdom Fungi, though its exact relations remain uncertain, and it is considered a protozoan by the International Society of Protistologists (see Protista, below). Molecular analysis of Zygomycota has found it to be polyphyletic (its members do not share an immediate ancestor), which is considered undesirable by many biologists. Accordingly, there is a proposal to abolish the Zygomycota phylum. Its members would be divided between phylum Glomeromycota and four new subphyla incertae sedis (of uncertain placement): Entomophthoromycotina, Kickxellomycotina, Mucoromycotina, and Zoopagomycotina.

Protista 

Kingdom Protista (or Protoctista) is included in the traditional five- or six-kingdom model, where it can be defined as containing all eukaryotes that are not plants, animals, or fungi. Protista is a polyphyletic taxon, which is less acceptable to present-day biologists than in the past. Proposals have been made to divide it among several new kingdoms, such as Protozoa and Chromista in the Cavalier-Smith system.

Protist taxonomy has long been unstable, with different approaches and definitions resulting in many competing classification schemes. The phyla listed here are used for Chromista and Protozoa by the Catalogue of Life, adapted from the system used by the International Society of Protistologists.

The Catalogue of Life includes Rhodophyta and Glaucophyta in kingdom Plantae, but other systems consider these phyla part of Protista.

Bacteria 

Currently there are 40 bacterial phyla (not including "Cyanobacteria") that have been validly published according to the Bacteriological Code
 Acidobacteriota, phenotypically diverse and mostly uncultured
 Actinomycetota, High-G+C Gram positive species
 Aquificota, deep-branching
 Armatimonadota
 Atribacterota
 Bacillota, Low-G+C Gram positive species, such as the spore-formers Bacilli (aerobic) and Clostridia (anaerobic)
 Bacteroidota
 Balneolota
 Bdellovibrionota
 Caldisericota, formerly candidate division OP5, Caldisericum exile is the sole representative
 Calditrichota
 Campylobacterota
 Chlamydiota
 Chlorobiota, green sulphur bacteria
 Chloroflexota, green non-sulphur bacteria
 Chrysiogenota, only 3 genera (Chrysiogenes arsenatis, Desulfurispira natronophila, Desulfurispirillum alkaliphilum)
 Coprothermobacterota
 Deferribacterota
 Deinococcota, Deinococcus radiodurans and Thermus aquaticus are "commonly known" species of this phyla
 Dictyoglomota
 Elusimicrobiota, formerly candidate division Thermite Group 1
 Fibrobacterota
 Fusobacteriota
 Gemmatimonadota
 Ignavibacteriota
 Kiritimatiellota
 Lentisphaerota, formerly clade VadinBE97
 Mycoplasmatota, notable genus: Mycoplasma
 Myxococcota
 Nitrospinota
 Nitrospirota
 Planctomycetota
 Pseudomonadota, the most well-known phylum, containing species such as Escherichia coli or Pseudomonas aeruginosa
 Rhodothermota
 Spirochaetota, species include Borrelia burgdorferi, which causes Lyme disease
 Synergistota
 Thermodesulfobacteriota
 Thermomicrobiota
 Thermotogota, deep-branching
 Verrucomicrobiota

Archaea 

Currently there are 2 phyla that have been validly published according to the Bacteriological Code
 Nitrososphaerota
 Thermoproteota, second most common archaeal phylum
Other phyla that have been proposed, but not validly named, include:
 "Euryarchaeota", most common archaeal phylum
 "Korarchaeota"
 "Nanoarchaeota", ultra-small symbiotes, single known species

See also 

 Cladistics
 Phylogenetics
 Systematics
 Taxonomy

References

External links 

 Are phyla "real"? Is there really a well-defined "number of animal phyla" extant and in the fossil record?
 Major Phyla Of Animals